Firdos Square is a public open space in central Baghdad, Iraq. It is named after the Arabic word Firdows, which means "paradise".  The site has been the location of several monumental artworks.

Description
The 17 Ramadan Mosque and two of the best-known hotels in Baghdad, the Palestine Hotel and the Sheraton Ishtar, are located on the square. 

The roundabout in the center of Firdos Square has been the site of several monuments beginning with the completion of the monumental arch The Unknown Soldier in 1959. It was subsequently replaced by the statue of Saddam Hussein that was removed by U.S. coalition forces during the invasion of Iraq in 2003. A green, abstract sculpture by Bassem Hamad al-Dawiri was commissioned to replace the Saddam statue. In 2009, the architect of the Monument to the Unknown Soldier Rifat Chadirji expressed interest in rebuilding the monument on its original site. As of 2013, the al-Dawiri statue and the surrounding columns have been removed from Firdos Square.

Statue destruction

In April 2002, a  statue, designed by Iraqi sculptor, Khalid Ezzat, was erected in honour of Saddam Hussein's 65th birthday.

In 2003, the statue was pulled down by Iraqi citizens, with the help of American forces during the invasion of Iraq in front of a crowd of around a hundred Iraqis. The event was widely televised, and some of this footage was criticized for exaggerating the size of the crowd. Robert Fisk described it as "the most staged photo opportunity since Iwo Jima".

Replacement statue
The site of statue now houses a green, abstract sculpture intended to symbolize "freedom", designed by sculptor Bassem Hamad al-Dawiri and built by a group of artists calling themselves, Najin (The Survivors). The replacement sculpture was constructed quickly and completed within months of its predecessor's removal. Of necessity, the statue makes use of basic construction materials and methods. It is made of painted plaster, seven metres (23 feet) in height and includes a symbolic Iraqi family holding aloft a crescent moon, which represents Islam and the sun representing the ancient Sumerian civilization.

2005 protest
On April 9, 2005, the second anniversary of the invasion of Iraq, the square was the center of a large-scale demonstration from tens of thousands of Iraqis protesting the American occupation. The demonstration was organized by Moqtada Sadr, a Shi'ite cleric, and supported by Sheikh Abd al-Zahra al-Suwaid, a follower of the Green Party. Suwaid was quoted as stating to the gathered "The rally must be peaceful. You should demand the withdrawal of the occupation forces and press for quicker trials for Saddam Hussein and his aides before an Iraqi court."

See also 

 Media coverage of the Iraq War
 Iraqi art
 Al-Habboubi Square

References

Buildings and structures in Baghdad
Monuments and memorials in Iraq
Iraq War
United States Marine Corps in the Iraq War
Squares in Iraq